Berenda  (Spanish: Berrenda, meaning "female antelope") is an unincorporated community in Madera County, California. Berenda is located on the Southern Pacific Railroad.

The Berendo post office opened in 1873, closed for a period in 1881, changed its name to Berenda in 1919, and closed in 1935.

References

Unincorporated communities in California
Unincorporated communities in Madera County, California